Greendale High School is a four-year public high school in Greendale, Wisconsin, a suburb of Milwaukee. Part of the Greendale School District, it serves students in grades 9 through 12.

Extracurricular activities 
The Greendale High School marching band has been the Class AA State Champion for 17 consecutive years, from 2005 to 2020, and was selected to participate in the 2016 Macy's Thanksgiving Day Parade in New York City as well as the 2020 Tournament of Roses Parade in Pasadena, CA.

Notable alumni 
 Jim Gruenwald - Greco-Roman wrestler, former US Olympic team member
 Dave Smith - AFL player
Jane Kaczmarek - Actress
Stephen D. Burrows - Comedic storyteller, writer, director, actor

Notes

External links

Public high schools in Wisconsin
Educational institutions established in 1953
Schools in Milwaukee County, Wisconsin
1953 establishments in Wisconsin
Greendale, Wisconsin